Russett is an unincorporated planned community of  within the Maryland City CDP in far-western Anne Arundel County, Maryland, United States, near the city of Laurel.

Approximately 13,000 residents live in Russett, which is divided into 21 residential neighborhoods, including four condominium communities, 11 town homes, and six single-family home neighborhoods. Three apartment rental properties on four sites pay assessments to Russett, as do several on-site commercial properties, including a Walmart and Sam's Club. The community is built out to a capacity of 3,600 units.

Organization
The Russett Community Association, Inc. (RCA) is the homeowners' association (HOA), and all homeowners are members. Annual HOA fees paid by homeowners fund an annual $2.5 million budget, which goes toward maintenance of playgrounds; a tot lot; tennis, basketball and beach volleyball courts; four pools and a pool house; walking trails; a community center; and private security. The county opened a police substation near the community in 2006.

Except for condominiums, which have their own board of directors, each neighborhood has a committee with up to three members (elected at the annual RCA meeting).  These three elect a chairperson who serves as the voting member.  Representatives from all neighborhoods meet monthly and advise on community issues, with voting members deciding on changes to community documents, special fee assessments, and membership in the board of directors.

In November 2018, FirstService Residential contracted with Russett to provide property management services for the community.

Geography
The Nature Conservancy considers the preserve's Laurel Oxbow Lake the largest naturally occurring freshwater lake in the state. Also adjacent to Russett, along its southwestern borders, is an undisturbed  land parcel owned by the Anne Arundel County Board of Education.

Government services
Within Russett is a $4.3 million library operated by Anne Arundel County Public Library. Completed in 1998, The Maryland City at Russett Branch is more than  – or four times the size of its shuttered predecessor – with an initial collection of 80,000 items. The project was built on  donated by the developer, Russett Community Limited Partnership (RCLP).

Russett is within the 20724 ZIP Code and falls within Maryland State Senate and House of Delegates District 32. The community also lies within Maryland's 3rd congressional district and Anne Arundel County's 4th Council District.

History
Russett faced growth pressures triggered by the 2005 base realignment and closure process (known as BRAC). About 22,000 defense workers were expected to relocate to nearby Fort Meade over the next several years. About 100 to 150 households would move to Russett over that period because of BRAC, according to state projections.

Schools
The community is served by Anne Arundel County Public Schools and several private schools.

Gallery

References

External links
 Russett Community Association
 Maryland City at Russett Branch of the Anne Arundel County Public Library

Unincorporated communities in Maryland
Unincorporated communities in Anne Arundel County, Maryland
Baltimore metropolitan area
Washington metropolitan area